Toʻrtkoʻl District is a district of Karakalpakstan in Uzbekistan. The capital lies at the city Toʻrtkoʻl.

The district contains one city (Toʻrtkoʻl), five towns (Miskin, Turkmankuli, Tozabog, Nurli yoʻl and Amirobod) and 15 rural communities (A. Durdiyev, Jonboshqala, Kana Turtkul, Kaltaminor, Koʻkcha, Ata‘uba, Oʻzbekiston, Oqboshli, Oqqamish, Paxtaabad, Paxtachi, Tazabogʻyap, Ullubogʻ, Shoʻraxon, Qumboskan).

References

Karakalpakstan
Districts of Uzbekistan